The  is a privately-owned cruiseferry operator connecting Nagoya, Sendai, and Tomakomai in Japan. It is a subsidiary of the Nagoya-based Meitetsu Group, a group of companies that focuses primarily on rail transport in the Chūkyō metropolitan area.

History 
The current route between Nagoya, Sendai, and Tomakomai soon began in 1973. 

In 1982, the Meitetsu Group acquired the Taiheiyō Enkai Ferry and renamed it to its current name.

Routes 
The Taiheiyō Ferry operates a single regular route between Nagoya, Sendai, and Tomakomai. Ships operate every day between Sendai and Tomakomai, and every other day between Nagoya and Sendai. Out of the three ships the company operates, only the Kiso and Ishikari stop at Nagoya. The company also operates seasonal routes to Ise Bay, Kōchi, Okinawa, and the Bonin Islands.

Fleet

Current fleet 
The Taiheiyō Ferry has operated a total of twelve ships, three of which are in operation: the Kiso, Ishikari, and Kitakami, which are named after the Kiso, Ishikari, and Kitakami rivers, respectively. The names are chosen to represent each region (Chūbu, Hokkaido, and Tōhoku) that the ferry serves.

All ships can carry a certain number of cars as well as passengers. Additionally, all ships are equipped with dining rooms and rooms for lodging.

Former fleet

Incidents
During the 2011 Tōhoku earthquake, the Kitakami (1st generation) was moored at Sendai. The Kitakami managed to escape to sea before the ensuing tsunami, but Taiheiyō Ferry's terminal was heavily damaged along with the rest of the Port of Sendai. 123 cars belonging to the company and most of the equipment on shore were lost. Regular services to Sendai resumed on June 5th, and repairs to the terminal building were completed on July 8th.

See also

References

External links

Ferry companies of Japan
1970 establishments in Japan